Jacob Young (born 1979) is an American singer and actor, in All My Children.

Jacob Young may also refer to:

Jacob Young (documentarian) (born 1952)
Jacob Young (musician), Norwegian musician
Jacob Young (politician), English Conservative MP
Jacob Young (basketball), American basketball player
Jacob Young (soccer), Australian footballer
Jake Young (American football) (Jacob Cardwell Young III, 1968–2002), American football player

See also

Jacob Jung (1857–1931), politician